DeAndre Carter (born April 10, 1993) is an American football wide receiver and return specialist for the Los Angeles Chargers of the National Football League (NFL). He played college football at Sacramento State before signing with the Baltimore Ravens as an undrafted free agent in 2015. Carter has also been a member of several other NFL teams.

College career
Carter attended Sacramento State, where he played wide receiver and was named first-team FCS All-American in 2014 after recording 99 receptions for 1,321 yards and 17 touchdowns.

Professional career

Baltimore Ravens
Carter signed with the Baltimore Ravens on May 3, 2015. After a successful training camp, he seemed to have a chance of making the final roster. However, after failing to win the return job during the first three weeks of preseason, he was released by the Ravens on August 31, 2015 as part of the first wave of roster cuts.

Oakland Raiders
Carter signed to the Oakland Raiders practice squad on September 16, 2015 after the Raiders traded wide receiver Brice Butler to the Dallas Cowboys. On December 1, 2015, he was released from the practice squad.

New England Patriots
On December 15, 2015, Carter was signed by the New England Patriots to their practice squad. He was released on January 12, 2016 but was re-signed the next day. On January 26, 2016, Carter signed a futures contract with the Patriots.

On September 3, 2016, Carter was released by the Patriots as part of final roster cuts.

San Francisco 49ers
On February 24, 2017, Carter signed a two-year contract with the San Francisco 49ers. He was waived on September 2, 2017 and was signed to the practice squad the next day. He signed a reserve/future contract with the 49ers on January 2, 2018. On May 15, 2018, Carter was waived by the team.

Philadelphia Eagles
On July 28, 2018, Carter signed with the Philadelphia Eagles. He made the Eagles' final roster. In the 2018 season opener against the Atlanta Falcons, he recorded a 10-yard reception, the first of his NFL career, in the 18–12 victory. Carter took over kick and punt return duties with regular returner Darren Sproles sidelined with an injury. Carter was waived by the Eagles on September 18, 2018 after two games. He was re-signed to the team's practice squad on September 20. He was promoted back to the active roster on September 29, 2018. Carter was waived by the Eagles on November 6, 2018.

Houston Texans
On November 7, 2018, Carter was claimed off waivers by the Houston Texans.

On March 11, 2020, Carter was re-signed to a one-year contract by the Texans. On November 17, 2020, Carter was waived by the Texans.

Chicago Bears
On November 18, 2020, Carter was claimed off waivers by the Chicago Bears. He was placed on the reserve/COVID-19 list by the team on December 10, 2020, and activated on December 22.

Washington Football Team

Carter signed with the Washington Football Team on April 1, 2021. He was named NFC Special Teams Player of the Week in Week 4 against the Atlanta Falcons after he returned a kickoff 101 yards for his first career touchdown. Carter recorded his first career receiving touchdown in a Week 8 game against the Denver Broncos.

Los Angeles Chargers
Carter signed a one-year contract with the Los Angeles Chargers on April 8, 2022.

Personal life
Carter's younger brother, Kaylan, died in 2013 after going into cardiac arrest during a weight training session with his football team in high school. At Sacramento State, Carter majored in communication studies. Carter served as a substitute teacher at Martin Luther King Middle School in 2016.

References

External links
 
 Los Angeles Chargers bio
 Sacramento State Hornets bio

1993 births
21st-century African-American sportspeople
Living people
African-American players of American football
American football return specialists
American football wide receivers
Baltimore Ravens players
Chicago Bears players
Houston Texans players
Los Angeles Chargers players
New England Patriots players
Oakland Raiders players
Philadelphia Eagles players
Players of American football from San Jose, California
Sacramento State Hornets football players
San Francisco 49ers players
Washington Football Team players